The individual jumping competition of the equestrian events at the 2015 Pan American Games took place July 21–25 at the Caledon Equestrian Park. .

The top team not already qualified in the dressage team events qualified for the 2016 Summer Olympics in Rio de Janeiro, Brazil, along with the top two placed teams (not already qualified) in the show jumping competition. In the individual dressage competition, the top nation (not qualified in the team event) in groups IV and V each qualified one quota. The top six athletes (not qualified in the team event) also qualified for the show jumping competition.

Schedule
All times are Central Standard Time (UTC-6).

Results

Qualification round

Final rounds

References

Equestrian at the 2015 Pan American Games